Johannes Handschumacher (July 5, 1887 – October 31, 1957) was a German politician of the Christian Democratic Union (CDU) and former member of the German Bundestag.

Life 
After the Second World War he joined the CDU. On 21 January 1953, he moved up to the German Bundestag on the North Rhine-Westphalian state list for the retired member of parliament Franz Etzel, to which he belonged until the end of the legislative period in the same year.

Literature

References

1887 births
1957 deaths
Members of the Bundestag for North Rhine-Westphalia
Members of the Bundestag 1949–1953
Members of the Bundestag for the Christian Democratic Union of Germany